Main Beach light rail station is the only light rail station servicing the Gold Coast suburb of Main Beach. The station is serviced by the Gold Coast's G:link light rail system. Main Beach is located on the western side of the Gold Coast Highway opposite the intersection of Tedder Avenue, Main Beach's main street.

Location  
Main Beach light rail station is only a short walk to Cafe's and Restaurants located on Tedder Avenue. Other attractions nearby include Sea World, Marina Mirage shopping centre and the Gold Coast Broadwater.

Below is a map of the local area. The station can be identified by the grey marker.{
  "type": "FeatureCollection",
  "features": [
    {
      "type": "Feature",
      "properties": {},
      "geometry": {
        "type": "Point",
        "coordinates": [
          153.42336654604878,
          -27.981967919282138
        ]
      }
    }
  ]
}

References

External links 

 G:link

G:link stations
Railway stations in Australia opened in 2014
Main Beach, Queensland